John Goldie may refer to:

John Goldie (philosopher) (1717–1811), friend of the poet Robert Burns
John Goldie (botanist) (1793–1886), Scottish-born botanist and author
John Goldie (barrister) (1849–1896), English rower and barrister
 Jack Goldie (John Wyllie Goldie, 1889–1958), Scottish footballer 
John Goldie (darts player) (born 1985), Scottish darts player
John Goldie (rugby league), rugby player for the Carluke Tigers